The 1992 United Kingdom general election was held on Thursday 9 April 1992, to elect 651 members to the House of Commons. The election resulted in the fourth consecutive victory for the Conservative Party since 1979 and would be the last time that the Conservatives would win an overall majority at a general election until 2015. It was also the last general election to be held on a day which did not coincide with any local elections until 2017. This election result took many by surprise, as opinion polling leading up to the election day had shown the Labour Party, under leader Neil Kinnock, consistently, if narrowly, ahead.

John Major had won the Conservative Party leadership election in November 1990 following the resignation of Margaret Thatcher. During his first term leading up to the 1992 election he oversaw the British involvement in the Gulf War, introduced legislation to replace the unpopular Community Charge with Council Tax, and signed the Maastricht Treaty. Britain was sliding into its second recession in a decade at the time of Major's appointment.

Opinion polls in the run-up to the election had suggested that it would end in a hung parliament or a narrow Labour majority. The fact that it produced a Conservative majority meant that it was one of the most dramatic and memorable elections in the UK since the end of the Second World War.

The Conservative Party received what remains the largest number of votes at a United Kingdom general election in British history, breaking the previous record set by the Labour Party in 1951. Former Conservative Leader and Prime Minister Margaret Thatcher, Former Labour Party leader Michael Foot, former SDP leader David Owen, three former Chancellors of the Exchequer, Denis Healey, Geoffrey Howe and Nigel Lawson, former Home Secretary Merlyn Rees, Francis Maude, Norman Tebbit, Rosie Barnes, Sinn Féin leader Gerry Adams and Speaker of the House of Commons Bernard Weatherill left the House of Commons after this election, though Maude and Adams returned at the next election. Future Conservative Leader Iain Duncan Smith was elected to parliament in this election.

Overview
The Conservatives had been re-elected in a landslide at the 1987 general election under the leadership of Margaret Thatcher, who had led the party back into power in 1979 and won a landslide majority in 1983, but her popularity and that of her government sharply declined due to internal divisions in the party and the unpopular Community Charge (also known as the 'poll tax'), as well as the fact that Britain was sliding into recession in the run-up to her resignation in November 1990.

Labour began to lead the Conservatives in the opinion polls by as much as 20 percentage points. Thatcher resigned following the party leadership ballot in November 1990, initiated by Michael Heseltine, and was replaced by her Chancellor of the Exchequer John Major. This was well received by the public; Labour lost some momentum as it reduced the impact of their calls for "Time for a Change".

On 16 January 1991, Operation Desert Storm began the Gulf War, the Major ministry's first foreign affairs crisis.  The quick and successful outcome on the conflict led to a boost in opinion polls for Major, in spite of the deepening recession and rising unemployment. Another boost in the polls for Major was his announcement that the unpopular community charge (poll tax) would be replaced with the Council Tax. The Labour opposition made repeated calls for a general election to be held during 1991, but Major resisted these calls.

As 1992 dawned, the recession had still not ended, unemployment now topped 2.5 million and the election loomed, with most opinion polls suggested that the election would produce a hung parliament or a narrow Labour majority, although the lead in the polls had shifted between Tory and Labour on several occasions since November 1990.

Parliament was due to expire no later than 16 June 1992. Major called the election on 11 March, as was widely expected, the day after Chancellor of the Exchequer Norman Lamont had delivered the Budget. The Conservatives maintained strong support in many newspapers, especially The Sun, which ran a series of anti-Labour articles that culminated on election day with a front-page headline which urged "the last person to leave Britain" to "turn out the lights" if Labour won the election.

Campaign
The 50th Parliament of the United Kingdom sat for the last time on Monday 16 March, being dissolved on the same day.

Under the leadership of Neil Kinnock, the Labour Party had undergone further developments and alterations since its 1987 general election defeat. Labour entered the campaign confident, with most opinion polls showing a slight Labour lead that if maintained suggested a hung parliament, with no single party having an overall majority.

The parties campaigned on the familiar grounds of taxation and health care. Major became known for delivering his speeches while standing on an upturned soapbox during public meetings. Immigration was also an issue, with Home Secretary Kenneth Baker making a controversial speech stating that, under Labour, the floodgates would be opened for immigrants from developing countries. Some speculated that this was a bid by the Conservatives to shore up its support amongst its white working-class supporters. The Conservatives also pounded the Labour Party over the issue of taxation, producing a memorable poster entitled "Labour's Double-Whammy", showing a boxer wearing gloves marked "tax rises" and "inflation".

An early setback for Labour came in the form of the "War of Jennifer's Ear" controversy, which questioned the truthfulness of a Labour party election broadcast concerning National Health Service (NHS) waiting lists.

Labour seemingly recovered from the NHS controversy, and opinion polls on 1 April (dubbed "Red Wednesday") showed a clear Labour lead. But the lead fell considerably in the following day's polls. Observers blamed the decline on the Labour Party's triumphalist "Sheffield Rally", an enthusiastic American-style political convention at the Sheffield Arena, where Neil Kinnock famously cried out "We're all right!" three times. However, some analysts and participants in the campaign believed it actually had little effect, with the event only receiving widespread attention after the election.

This was the first general election for the newly formed Liberal Democrats, a party formed by the formal merger of the SDP-Liberal Alliance following the 1987 general election. Its formation had not been without its problems, but under the strong leadership of Paddy Ashdown, who proved to be a likeable and candid figure, the party went into the election ready to win votes and seats. They focused on education throughout the campaign, as well as a promise on reforming the voting system.

The weather was largely dull for most of the campaign, but sunny conditions on 9 April may have been a factor in the high turnout.

Minor parties
In Scotland, the Scottish National Party (SNP) hoped for a major electoral breakthrough in 1992 and had run a hard independence campaign with "Free by '93" as their slogan, urging voters to back a party which would deliver Scottish independence from the United Kingdom. Although the party increased its total vote by 50% compared to 1987, they only held onto the three seats they had won at the previous election. They lost Glasgow Govan, which their deputy leader Jim Sillars had taken from Labour in a by-election in 1988. Sillars quit active politics after the general election with a parting shot at the Scottish electorate as being "ninety-minute patriots", referring to their supporting the Scotland national football team only during match time.

The election also saw a small change in Northern Ireland: the Conservatives organised and stood candidates in the constituent country for the first time since the Ulster Unionist Party had broken with them in 1972 over the Sunningdale Agreement. Although they won no seats, their best result was Laurence Kennedy achieving over 14,000 votes to run second to James Kilfedder in North Down.

Retirees

Former prime minister Margaret Thatcher stepped down at the general election, as did former cabinet minister Norman Tebbit, Labour veteran Denis Healey, former Conservative chancellor Nigel Lawson, Geoffrey Howe, former Labour leader Michael Foot, former SDP leader David Owen, Merlyn Rees, then-Speaker Bernard Weatherill, former Conservative Party chairman Cecil Parkinson, John Wakeham, Nicholas Ridley and Peter Morrison. Alan Clark also retired from Parliament, though he returned in 1997 as MP for Kensington and Chelsea, only to die two years later.

Endorsements
The following newspapers endorsed political parties running in the election in the following ways:

In a move later described in The Observer as appalling to its City readership, the Financial Times endorsed the Labour Party in this general election.

Polling

Almost every poll leading up to polling day predicted either a hung parliament with Labour the largest party, or a small Labour majority of around 19 to 23. Polls on the last few days before the country voted predicted a very slim Labour majority. Of the 50 opinion polls published during the election campaign period, 38 suggested Labour had a narrow but clear lead. After the polls closed, the BBC and ITV exit polls still predicted that there would be a hung parliament and "that the Conservatives would only just get more seats than Labour".

With opinion polls at the end of the campaign showing Labour and the Conservatives neck and neck, the actual election result was a surprise to many in the media and in polling organisations. The apparent failure of the opinion polls to come close to predicting the actual result led to an inquiry by the Market Research Society, and would eventually result in the creation of the British Polling Council a decade later. Following the election, most opinion polling companies changed their methodology in the belief that a 'Shy Tory factor' affected the polling.

Results

The election turnout of 77.67% was the highest in 18 years. There was an overall Labour swing of 2.2%, which widened the gap between Labour and the Liberal Democrats. Although the percentage of Conservative votes was only 0.3% down on 1987, the Conservative overall majority in the House of Commons was reduced from 102 to 21. This number was reduced progressively during the course of Major's term in office due to defections of MPs to other parties, by-election defeats, and for a time in 1994–95 the suspension of the Conservative whip for some MPs who voted against the government on its European policyby 1996, the Conservative majority had been reduced to just 1 seat, and they were in a minority going into 1997 until the 1997 general election. The Conservatives in 1992 received 14,093,007 votes, the highest total of votes for any political party in any UK general election, beating the previous largest total vote of 13.98 million achieved by Labour in 1951 (although this was from a smaller electorate and represented a higher vote share). Nine government ministers lost their seats in 1992, including party chairman Chris Patten.

The Suns analysis of the election results was headlined "It's The Sun Wot Won It", though in his testimony to the April 2012 Leveson Inquiry, Rupert Murdoch claimed that the "infamous" headline was "both tasteless and wrong".
Tony Blair also accepted this theory of Labour's defeat and put considerable effort into securing The Suns support for New Labour, both as Leader of the Opposition before the 1997 general election and as Prime Minister afterwards.

Steve Richards notes that one theory for Labour's defeat relates to Kinnock seeming triumphalist, "overconfident and cocky" at a major Labour Party election rally in Sheffield. At the time of the event polls suggested Labour was well ahead of the Conservatives. Richards argues the rally "acquired a mythological status as fatal event" after Labour's defeat, but considers this theory to be "a red herring". He notes that prior to the result of the election becoming known, "there was no suggestion that Kinnock had made a terrible blunder" at the event. Indeed, Richards notes that the BBC's political editor John Cole had indicated he had been impressed in his live reporting of the rally which Cole compared with similar events held by President Kennedy . Richards concluded that the party would have lost the election even if there had been no Sheffield Rally.

This election continued the Conservatives' decline in Northern England, with Labour regaining many seats they had not held since 1979. The Conservatives also began to lose support in the Midlands, but achieved a slight increase in their vote in Scotland, where they had a net gain of one seat. Labour and Plaid Cymru strengthened in Wales, with Conservative support declining. However, in the South East, South West, London and Eastern England the Conservative vote held up, leading to few losses there: many considered Basildon to be indicative of a nouveau riche working-class element, referred to as Essex man, voting strongly Conservative. This election is the most recent in which the Conservatives won more seats than Labour in Greater London, at 48 to 35; in the 1997 election, the Conservatives would win only 11.

For the Liberal Democrats their first election campaign was a reasonable success; the party had worked itself up from a "low base" during its troubled creation and come out relatively unscathed.

It was Labour's second general election defeat under leader Neil Kinnock and deputy leader Roy Hattersley. Both resigned soon after the election, and were succeeded by John Smith and Margaret Beckett respectively.

Sitting MPs Dave Nellist, Terry Fields, Ron Brown, John Hughes and Syd Bidwell, who had been expelled or deselected by the Labour Party and stood as independents, were all defeated, although in Nellist's case only very narrowly. Tommy Sheridan, fighting the election from prison, polled 19%.

:

|}
All parties with more than 500 votes shown. Plaid Cymru result includes votes for Green/Plaid Cymru Alliance.

Incumbents defeated

Television coverage

The BBC ran coverage from 22:00 till 06:00, and from 09:30 till 16:00 on Friday 10 April.

Coverage was, according to the Radio Times, supposed to end at 04:00 on Friday morning, but was extended.

The BBC began construction of the Election 92 studio in October 1990, completing it in February 1991, due to speculation that an early election may be called in 1991. Rehearsals were held in the event of a Conservative and Labour victory.

Although the election was not part of the storyline, there was much background chanting and campaigning in the BBC television soap opera EastEnders.

On ITV, ITN produced their election night coverage from their studios in London, with Jon Snow anchoring the coverage from 22:00 until 06:00. They continued their daytime coverage on Friday 10 April from 09:25 until 15:25. Breakfast coverage of the election results were provided by TV-am, the ITV breakfast franchise, from 06:00 until 09:25, who were producing their third and final general election special.

See also
 List of MPs elected in the 1992 United Kingdom general election
 Baltic Exchange bombing
 1992 United Kingdom general election in Scotland
 1992 United Kingdom general election in England
 1992 United Kingdom general election in Northern Ireland
 1992 United Kingdom general election in Wales
 1992 United Kingdom local elections

Manifestos
 The Best Future For Britain – 1992 Conservative manifesto.
 It's time to get Britain working again – 1992 Labour Party manifesto.
 Changing Britain for good – 1992 Liberal Democrats manifesto.

Notes

Further reading
 Butler, David E., et al. The British General Election of 1992  (1992), the standard scholarly study

External links
 Catalogue of 1992 general election ephemera at the Archives Division of the London School of Economics.

 
1992
General election
United Kingdom general election
Neil Kinnock
John Major